Metro Zu was an American hip hop group based in Miami, Florida. It consisted of Lofty305, Ruben Slikk, Freebase, and Poshstronaut. It has received attention from Vice and Fact. It was named the best Miami electronica artist of 2013 by Miami New Times.

Members
 Lofty305
 Ruben Slikk
 Freebase / Poshgod
 Poshstronaut / Mr. B the Poshstronaut

Discography

Mixtapes
 KushPak (2010)
 ElectroZlapp (2010)
 Buddha Therapy (2011)
 C.S.P.G. (2011)
 Mink Rug (2012)
 Zuology (2012)
 Z Unit (2013)

References

External links
 
 

Alternative hip hop groups
Musical groups established in 2007
Musical groups disestablished in 2015
Musical groups from Miami
Southern hip hop groups